The SMU–TCU football rivalry is an American college football rivalry between the SMU Mustangs football team of Southern Methodist University (SMU) and TCU Horned Frogs football of Texas Christian University (TCU). The winner of the game receives an iron skillet as a trophy.

History
The teams have played all but six years since their first meeting in 1915. They did not face each other in 1919, 1920, 1925, 1987, 1988, 2006 or 2020. Although no longer in the same conference, SMU and TCU have agreed to play each season through 2025 on an alternating home-and-away basis.

The 2020 game originally scheduled for September 11 was canceled due to TCU team members testing positive for COVID-19.

On November 29, 2021, SMU head coach Sonny Dykes was hired for the same position at TCU.

Iron Skillet
Two different versions of the story. In recent years SMU's website has claimed the following.
TCU and SMU fans began the tradition back in 1946. During pre-game festivities, an SMU fan was frying frog legs as a joke before the game. A TCU fan, seeing this desecration of the "frog", went over and told him that eating the frog legs was going well beyond the rivalry and that they should let the game decide who would get the skillet and the frog legs.  SMU won the game, and the skillet and frog legs went to SMU. The tradition eventually spilled over into the actual game and the Iron Skillet is now passed to the winner.

An article from TCU magazine tells the following story.
"The first "Battle for the Iron Skillet" occurred on November 30, 1946, as college football boomed after World War II. Weeks prior to the game, SMU’s Student Council proposed the idea of presenting a trophy to the winning team. TCU accepted the idea, and the two schools' governing bodies met in Dallas to set up the rules of the traveling trophy, which became the Iron Skillet." The TCU magazine article has this to say about the other story "One mystery remains: Why a skillet? History books provide scant details. Some claim that an SMU fan in the 1950s was caught frying frogs legs in a skillet at a tailgate before the game, and a TCU fan wagered that the winner should take the pan home, but that conflicts with a published report of the skillet originating with the councils."

Notable games

1935: For the Rose Bowl

TCU and SMU again met to decide not only the SWC title but the first trip to the Rose Bowl for a team from the SWC. Grantland Rice of the New York Sun called it the "Game of the Century" and reported the following:
In a TCU Stadium that seated 30,000 spectators, over 36,000 wildly excited Texans and visitors from every corner of the map packed, jammed, and fought their way into every square foot of standing and seating space to see one of the greatest football games ever played…this tense, keyed up crowd even leaped the wire fences from the top of automobiles…"
SMU scored the first 14 points. TCU, led by All-American quarterback Sammy Baugh, tied the game at the beginning of the fourth quarter. Then, with seven minutes left in the game SMU, on 4th and 4 on the Frogs' 37 yard-line, lined up to punt. Quarterback Bob Finley threw a 50-yard pass to running back Bobby Wilson who made what is described as a "jumping, twisting catch that swept him over the line for the touchdown."

Game results

See also  
 List of NCAA college football rivalry games
 List of most-played college football series in NCAA Division I

References

College football rivalries in the United States
SMU Mustangs football
TCU Horned Frogs football
American football in the Dallas–Fort Worth metroplex
1915 establishments in Texas